is a Japanese singer from Osaka Prefecture and is signed to Lantis.

Career
ChouCho initially formed the band Lotus Lotus in 2007 when still in high school and performed covers of songs from anime. Starting in June 2008, ChouCho began submitting videos of her singing on the Nico Nico Douga video sharing website. On July 27, 2011, she made her major debut with her single , which is used as the opening theme to the 2011 anime Heaven's Memo Pad. Her second single "Authentic symphony" was released on October 26, 2011 and is used as the opening theme to the 2011 anime Mashiroiro Symphony. In August 2011, she released the album Lapis with the producer Junky. ChouCho's third single  was released on November 23, 2011 and is used as the ending theme to the 2011 original video animation series The Legend of Heroes: Trails in the Sky. Her fourth single "Million of Bravery" was released on March 21, 2012 and is used as the theme song to the 2012 video game Kaku-San-Sei Million Arthur.

Her fifth single  was released on May 2, 2012 and is used as the opening theme to the 2012 anime Hyōka. ChouCho released her debut solo album Flyleaf on August 8, 2012, containing all previously released singles. Her sixth single "DreamRiser" was released on October 24, 2012 and is used as opening theme to the 2012 anime Girls und Panzer. Her seventh single  was released on May 22, 2013 and is used as the ending theme to the 2013 anime Gargantia on the Verdurous Planet. Her eighth single "Starlog" was released on July 31, 2013 and is used as the opening theme to the 2013 anime Fate/kaleid liner Prisma Illya. ChouCho's second studio album Secretgarden was released on December 25, 2013, containing her sixth through eighth singles.

Her ninth single  was released on February 26, 2014 and is used as the ending theme to the 2014 anime Buddy Complex. Her tenth single  was released on August 6, 2014 and is used as the opening theme to the 2014 anime Glasslip. Her 11th single "Bless Your Name" was released on April 15, 2015 and is used as the opening theme to the 2015 anime High School DxD BorN. Her 12th single "Piece of Youth" was released on November 25, 2015; the song is used as the theme song to the 2015 anime film Girls und Panzer der Film. ChouCho's 13th single  was released on February 24, 2016; the song is used as the ending theme to the 2016 anime Haruchika. Her 14th single "Asterism" was released on July 27, 2016; the song is used as the opening theme to the 2016 anime Fate/kaleid liner Prisma Illya 3rei!. ChouCho's 15th single "Elemental World" was released on February 15, 2017; the song is used as the ending theme to the 2017 anime Masamune-kun's Revenge. Her 16th single "Kaleidoscope /  was released on August 26, 2017. Her 17th single  was released on October 25, 2017; the song is used as the opening theme to the 2017 anime A Sister's All You Need. Her 18th single ; the title song is used as the ending theme to the 2018 anime Tsurune.

In 2019 she released the album Naked Garden, which featured acoustic covers of her songs as well as songs by other artists. She released a compilation album titled ChouCho the Best on December 8, 2021.

Discography

Albums

Studio albums

Compilation albums

Mini albums

Singles

Limited singles

Music videos

Other album appearances

References

External links
 Official website  
 Official website at Lantis 
 ChouCho's blog 
 Published videos at Nico Nico Douga 
  
 

Anime musicians
Lantis (company) artists
Living people
Musicians from Osaka Prefecture
Year of birth missing (living people)
21st-century Japanese singers
21st-century Japanese women singers
Utaite